The Old Man and the Seymour is a 2009 American comedy short film starring Streeter Seidell and Amir Blumenfeld. It was written and directed by Giancarlo Fiorentini and Jonathan Grimm.

Seymour, portrayed by Seidell, is taken in by his uncle, portrayed by Blumenfeld.  Seymour's uncle, a 47-year-old man with growth hormone deficiency, is mistaken for a high schooler.  Finding himself suddenly popular, meeting girls and going to parties, Seymour's uncle decides to pretend that he is in fact the new kid in school.  Things go downhill.

The film was selected to the Austin Film Festival, Friars Club Comedy Film Festival, LA Shorts Fest, among others. It premiered at NYU's First Run Film Festival, and was the directors' thesis project.

A nosebleed effect used when Seymour (Streeter Seidell) is hit in the face with a dodgeball by Craig (Dan Gurewitch) is made by Erik Beck from Indy Mogul.

Cast
 Amir Blumenfeld as Lewis Plunkett
 Streeter Seidell as Seymour Plunkett
 Heather Cavalet as Mindy
 Liz Cackowski as Lawyer
 Jordan Carlos as Mr. Horsey
 Shawn Harrison as Shawn
 Dan Gurewitch as Craig
 Agustín González as Gus
 Nick Raio as Gord Plunkett

References

External links
 Official Website

2009 films
2009 comedy films
2000s English-language films
2009 short films
American comedy short films
2000s American films